Bermad is a developer and manufacturer of various water and flow management solutions.

The company was founded in 1965 as a producer of irrigation systems mainly for agriculture. It has since expanded its product offering for a variety of industries, including filtration systems, reservoir management, air valves, water meters and fire protection solutions. Bermad products are marketed in 70 countries through a number of subsidiaries and distributors around the world, including subsidiaries in the United States, the United Kingdom, Australia, Brazil, Mexico, China, France, Singapore, Italy, Spain and India.

Products
Bermad is divided into four different business units or divisions, each aimed at a different industry or market.

Irrigation 
Irrigation solutions have been the primary products developed since the founding of Bermad in 1965. The range of irrigation products includes hydraulic control valves and flow management products for a range of irrigation system types such as drip irrigation and sprinklers.

Buildings & Construction 
The company's building & construction business unit include a number of flow and distribution management products aimed at the construction industry, such as pressure and level control, pump and flow, dry pipes, and deluge valves.

Waterworks 
The waterworks unit offers solutions for water supply, pumping stations, water distribution grid networks and sewage management. This includes various water meters, pressure valves, and flow, pump, surge, level and burst control valves.

Fire Protection 
The fire protection unit offers solutions marketed for sprinkler and fire fighting systems, with a number of products and solutions for fail-safe and flow management of water and other fire protection fluids or foams. These include various deluges, solenoid valves, monitor valves, foam concentrate valves, fire line strainers and so on.

Timeline 
 1965 - Bermad established
 1965 - Irrigation Division Created
 1972 - Waterworks Division Created
 1973 - 700 Series (Industrial Double Chamber Control Valves) Introduced
 1977 - Bermad USA Founded
 1985 - 400 Series (Control Valves with Balanced & Peripherally Supported Diaphragm) Introduced
 1987 - Bermad Marketing & Sales Export Departments Created
 1994 - Fire Protection Division Founded
 1995 - Bermad Brasil Founded
 1996 - Bermad Italy Founded
 1999 - Bermad Mexico Founded
 2002 - Bermad Water Technologies, Australia Founded
 2003 - Bermad UK Founded
 2006 - 700-ES (Double Chamber Anti-Cavitation Valves) Introduced
 2008 - Bermad China Founded
 2010 - Bermad Singapore Founded
 2011 - Air Valves Series and Torrent Series Introduced
 2012 - Bermad Europe Founded
 2014 - Buildings Services Division Created
 2015 - Bermad Israel Founded
 2016 - Bermad India Founded
 2016 - Advanced Metering Solutions Introduced
 2018 - Over 30,000,000 Products Installed Around the World
 2019 - Opening and Establishing the Digital Department for Digital Products and Services

Subsidiaries

Bermad CS. Ltd. - Global HQ.
Bermad Europe S.L. - Europe branch located in Barcelona, Spain.
Bermad UK Ltd. - United Kingdom branch located in Hungerford, Berkshire.
Bermad Water Technologies Pty - Australia branch located in Thomastown, Victoria.
Bermad China Co. Ltd. - China branch located in Shanghai.
Bermad France S.A.S. - France branch located in Saint-Maur-des-Fossés, Paris.
Bermad Brazil - Brazil & South America branch located in Sao Paulo.
Bermad Mexico SA de CV - Mexico branch located in Lerma.
VICTAULIC Bermad Technologies, LLC - US branch located in Houston, Texas.
Bermad Inc. - US irrigation branch located in Fresno, California.
Bermad India - India branch located in Pune, Maharashtra.
Bermad South-East Asia - located in Singapore.
Bermad Italy S.R.L. - Italy branch located in Lonate Pozzolo.

See also
 IDE Technologies 
 Netafim

References

External links

 
 
 
 
 

Utilities of Israel
Water desalination
Technology companies established in 1965
1965 establishments in Israel
Manufacturing companies of Israel
Agriculture companies of Israel